38th National Board of Review Awards
January 10, 1967
The 38th National Board of Review Awards were announced on January 10, 1967.

Top Ten Films 
A Man for All Seasons
Born Free
Alfie
Who's Afraid of Virginia Woolf?
The Bible: In the Beginning
Georgy Girl
John F. Kennedy: Years of Lightning, Day of Drums
It Happened Here
The Russians Are Coming, the Russians Are Coming
Shakespeare Wallah

Top Foreign Films 
The Sleeping Car Murders
The Gospel According to St. Matthew
The Shameless Old Lady
A Man and a Woman
Hamlet

Winners 
Best Film: A Man for All Seasons
Best Foreign Film: The Sleeping Car Murders
Best Actor: Paul Scofield (A Man for All Seasons)
Best Actress: Elizabeth Taylor (Who's Afraid of Virginia Woolf?
Best Supporting Actor: Robert Shaw (A Man for All Seasons)
Best Supporting Actress: Vivien Merchant (Alfie)
Best Director: Fred Zinnemann (A Man for All Seasons)

External links 
National Board of Review of Motion Pictures :: Awards for 1966

1966
National Board of Review Awards
National Board of Review Awards
National Board of Review Awards
National Board of Review Awards